Dropie is a protected site in the Slovak municipalities of Čalovec, Kameničná and Zemianska Olča in the Komárno District. It has a protection level of 4 under the Slovak nature protection system.

Description
The protected site was created to protect the endangered bird species Great Bustard, especially its display sites, the sites of breeding and hibernation.

References

Geography of Nitra Region
Protected areas of Slovakia